J. Michael Garrison (born April 1945) was tenth bishop of the Episcopal Diocese of Western New York, serving from 1999 to 2011.

Biography
Garrison was born in 1945 in Philadelphia, Pennsylvania. He has a bachelor's and a master's of religious education from Pontifical College Josephinum in Columbus, Ohio and an honorary doctorate from General Theological Seminary in New York City. He was ordained a deacon in 1970 and priest in 1971 in the Roman Catholic Church. He joined the Episcopal Church on April 1, 1975, and was received as a deacon on April 12, 1975, and priest on August 25, 1975. He served as assistant at St Paul's Church in Sparks, Nevada before becoming regional vicar. He also served as vicar of St Matthew's Church in Las Vegas, Nevada. He was elected Bishop of Western New York on December 5, 1998. He was consecrated on April 24, 1999.

As bishop he was active in international mission work and annually led a group of diocesan missioners to Honduras to carry out work at an orphanage sponsored by the Episcopal Church. Moreover, he also ordained the first three non-stipendiary locally trained priests in the Diocese of Western Massachusetts. Garrison was also active in youth work and established the annual Bishop's Ball which brings together a number of young people. He retired on April 30, 2011. He is married to Carol Sohanney Garrison and has three children, three stepchildren and two grandchildren.

See also
 List of Episcopal bishops of the United States
 Historical list of the Episcopal bishops of the United States

References

External links 
Western New York Elects Its 10th Bishop
Episcopal Diocese Celebrates Ministry of Bishop J. Michael Garrison

1945 births
Living people
Converts to Anglicanism from Roman Catholicism
Clergy from Philadelphia
Pontifical College Josephinum alumni
General Theological Seminary alumni
Christian missionaries in Honduras
Episcopal bishops of Western New York